Hoseynabad-e Fishtaqeh (also Romanized as Ḩoseynābād-e Fīshtaqeh; also known as Ḩoseynābād, Ḩoseynābād-e Fashtaqeh, Hoseynābad-e Foshtaqeh, and Ḩoseynābād-e Foshtaqqeh) is a village in Sofla Rural District, in the Central District of Kharameh County, Fars Province, Iran. At the 2006 census, its population was 511, in 118 families.

References 

Populated places in Kharameh County